is a magical girl anime series by Studio Pierrot.  It was simultaneously released as a manga by Kiyoko Arai. The fourth magical girl series created by Studio Pierrot, Pastel Yumi also appears in a feature-length OVA as well as the Majokko Club Yoningumi A-kūkan kara no Alien X OVA. Anime Sols attempted to crowd-fund the release of the show on North American DVD, but was not successful.

The series became available on the streaming service RetroCrush on May 1, 2020. However the series was taken down on September 1, 2020 as it was discovered that the subtitles for episodes 16-25 on the site came from the fansubber Johnny English Subs without his approval. It eventually returned to RetroCrush on March 26, 2021.

Story

Yumi Hanazono loves flowers. She does not perform well in school, but loves to draw, and wants to be a manga artist. Her family runs a flower shop so she has grown up with a floral appreciation. Yumi is a very good artist, but does not always use the best judgement when she chooses her subjects. On the day of the Flower Festival, she entertains the other children by
drawing portraits of the Lady Fukurokouji on the walls of her mansion. An angry Fukurokouji makes her clean the entire wall, but as she is doing so, she sees Fukurokouji about to destroy a dandelion. After saving it, she replants it in a tulip field. To her surprise, it starts speaking to her. The voices belong to Kakimaru and Keshimaru, two flower elves who have come to the Human World to grant Yumi special powers as a reward for her kindness.

The two elves give Yumi a magical wand and locket made from tulip blossoms. If Yumi draws something in mid-air with her wand, and recites the phrase, "Pastel Poppuru Poppin-pa!", whatever she drew will become real. The magic will only last for a short time, however.

Yumi uses her new powers to get to the Flower Festival celebrations by drawing a horse (which the elves turn into a pegasus). She uses them again when she accidentally ruins her father's contest entry, a life-size doll. She creates a duplicate dress and models it herself.

Yumi's new power does have limits, though. She must be very inventive when solving problems, and whatever solution she thinks of must work within a time limit.

Cast
Yumi Hanazono: Mariko Shiga
Kakimaru: Miina Tominaga
Keshimaru: Yuriko Fuchizaki
Kyōhei Misawa: Yū Mizushima
Kenta Misawa: Chika Sakamoto
Ichirō Hanazono: Yoshito Yasuhara
Momoko Hanazono: Yūko Mita
Mrs. Fukurokōji: Hiroko Maruyama
Kunimitsu: Shigeru Chiba
Dankichi Hanazono: Kei Tomiyama
Musutaki: Sukekiyo Kameyama

Staff
Director: Akira Shigino
Series Coordinator: Shōji Imai
Character Design: Yumiko Harazawa, Kōji Motoyama
Music: Kōji Makaino
Production: Studio Pierrot

Theme songs
Kin no Ribon de Rock-shite
Opening theme
Lyrics: Keiko Asō
Composition: Etsuko Yamakawa
Vocals: Mariko Shiga/Hideaki Tokunaga (Cantonese:Angela Fong)
Freesia no Shōnen
Ending theme
Lyrics: Keiko Asō
Composition: Etsuko Yamakawa
Vocals: Mariko Shiga

Episode titles
Machi wa Mahō de Hanazakari
Mahō no Suteki na Tsukai Kata
Yoroshiku Bōken Girl
Ojii-chan Adventure
Kami Hikōki kara no Dengon
Futari no Fukurokōji-san
Namida no Diet Nikki
Mōichido Romance
Tobe Ai no Tsubasa de Sky High
Itazura Bake ni Goyōjin
Fushigi? Ōgontori Densetsu
Onee-sama wa Tsurai yo
Omakase Cupid
Omoide ni Kieta Kakimaru
Yōsei ga Kureta Ongakukai
Sumire Iro no Hatsukoi
Yumi-chan Ki o Tsukete
Hassha Bell ga Naru made
Hanabira no Step
Hana o Aishitemimasen ka?
Habatake Sora e Kaze o Ukete
Koi no Miscast
Iedeshita Otō-san
Sayonara Flower Town
Wasurenaide Memory

OVAs

Majokko Club Yoningumi A-kūkan kara no Alien X (魔女子クラブ四人組: A空間からのAlienX | "The 4 Magic Girls' Club: Alien X from Dimension A")
Yumi, Persia, Mami, and Emi join forces to protect the Earth by fighting aliens on the surface of the moon using their transformation abilities and magical powers. The OVA does nothing to advance the storylines in any of the individual stories, but is rather a side story for the four magical girl series released by Studio Pierrot. An official mook titled Majokko Club was published by Bandai under the B-Club Special imprint on 1987-10-15. The mook features many pages of stills from the OVA as well as character, staff, and production information. The next OVA in the series was Harbor Light Story, the inspiration for the Fancy Lala series ten years later.

References

External links
Pastel Yumi, the Magic Idol
Pastel Yumi, the Magic Idol 

1986 anime television series debuts
1986 Japanese television series endings
1986 manga
Drama anime and manga
Magical girl anime and manga
Nippon TV original programming
Pierrot (company)
Shogakukan manga
Shōjo manga